This is a list of lakes of Ethiopia, located completely or partially within the country's borders.

Lakes

Lakes not confirmed with coordinates 
 Lake Chelelektu
 Lake Gargori
 Lake Laitali

See also

 Rift Valley lakes

Ethiopia
Lakes